Ben Stivers is an American musician. Stivers records, tours, and collaborates with artists across multiple genres, including jazz, blues, rock, pop, Latin pop, and jazz fusion.  In June 2019 Ben joined Lyle Lovett and His Large Band on their US tour, playing piano and keyboards.

Early life
Stivers was born in Indiana but his family moved to Las Vegas when he was four to pursue musical careers.  His father was the bandleader at UNLV and his mother was a professional violin player.  Stivers was a devoted classical piano student and earned recognition as a finalist in the prestigious Arnold Bullock National Piano Competition at age 16.  While attending Chaparral High School (Paradise, Nevada), he took an interest in jazz fusion bands such as the Yellowjackets and Weather Report that drew him to synthesizers and groove.

Miami
Stivers moved to Miami in 1986 to pursue a degree in Studio Music and Jazz at the University of Miami Frost School of Music under Vince Maggio.

In Miami he worked with numerous high-profile artists such as Gloria Estefan, Ricky Martin, Chayanne, Exposé, Jon Secada, Julio Iglesias, Emilio Estefan, Dan Warner, Matchbox 20 and many others.

A highlight of his Miami years was his collaboration with the Gibb family.  He has toured and collaborated with Barry Gibb since the early 90s and he played piano and keyboards with the Bee Gees. He played on the Bee Gees records This Is Where I Came In and One Night Only (Bee Gees album).

Mallorca 
Stivers moved to Spain in the late 90s to pursue a full-time jazz residency project in Mallorca.

New York City
In 2001 Stivers moved to New York City, where he played with musicians such as Teddy Kumpel, Kenny Rampton, Rez Abbasi, Donny McCaslin, Groove Collective and many others. He subsequently founded the Ben Stivers Organ Trio.

In addition to his jazz piano and organ work, Stivers collaborates with many singer/songwriters, dance studios, producers and performers.  Some of his collaborations include Scott Sharrard, Tony Scherr, James Maddock, Dana Fuchs, Erik Blicker, Jason Darling, Kate Chaston, Christine Courtin and others.

In 2019 Ben joined Lyle Lovett and His Large Band on their US tour. In 2017-2018, Stivers was a member of the Chris Botti Band.  Other tours include the Barry Gibb Mythology Tour, Rez Abbasi, Gregg Allman Band,  and others.

Discography
 1991 Extra Strength, Active Ingredient
 1992 Exposé, Exposé
 1994 On a Ride, Prince Rahiem
 1995 Let 'Em Roll, Loaded Dice
 1996 Armageddon, Mission Control
 1996 Trilogia, Trilogia
 1998 Señor Bolero, José Feliciano
 1998 One Night Only, Bee Gees
 2000 VH1 Storytellers, Bee Gees
 2001 This Is Where I Came In, Bee Gees
 2002 Shallow Breath, Marcus Wolf
 2003 Deluxe, Ron Sunshine
 2006 No Vacancy, Jake Stigers
 2006 Kazually Speaking, Kazual
 2006 Five O'Clock News, Ryan Scott
 2006 MTV Unplugged, Ricky Martin
 2007 Black and White Tour, Ricky Martin
 2007 Ricky Martin... Live Black & White Tour, Ricky Martin
 2009 Far from Home: A Tribute to European Song, Beat Kaestli
 2009 What Does It Take?, Nell Bryden
 2010 Mirror, Marcus Wolf
 2012 Scott Sharrard & the Brickyard Band, Scott Sharrard
 2013 Moon over Babylon, Kenny Rampton
 2014 Heart of Memphis, Robin McKelle & the Flytones
 2015 Gregg Allman Live: Back to Macon GA, Gregg Allman
 2016 Behind the Vibration, Rez Abbasi
 2016 In the Now, Barry Gibb
 2017 The Green, James Maddock

References

External links
 Official Website
 Discogs Discography
 Allmusic Discography

Living people
American jazz pianists
American male pianists
Musicians from Las Vegas
Musicians from Brooklyn
American jazz organists
American male organists
1968 births
20th-century American pianists
Jazz musicians from New York (state)
21st-century American pianists
21st-century organists
20th-century American male musicians
21st-century American male musicians
American male jazz musicians
21st-century American keyboardists
Lyle Lovett and His Large Band members